Aglio e Olio is an EP by the Beastie Boys, released in 1995. The ep showcases a return to the band's hardcore punk roots.

Recording and release
The EP was released after the band realized that it had written too many hardcore punk songs for its next record. Michael "Mike D" Diamond later said, "When we first started working on Hello Nasty in New York, Amery "Awol" Smith was around helping us get set up. Along with the usual bunch of experimental jamming/sampling etc., we started playing a bunch of hardcore, putting song arrangements together really quickly. Then I started writing vocals. Soon we realized that we had way too many hardcore songs to possibly put on the next album, so we decided to release them all together as an EP."

"Aglio e Olio" means "Garlic and Oil" in Italian, a reference to one of the simplest pasta dressings used in Italy. According to Mike D, the title was chosen "to let the kids know, it's eight songs but only ten minutes. It's important to let the people know". Aglio e Olio was the first album released by the Beastie Boys since their 1982 EP Polly Wog Stew to feature entirely hardcore punk songs. All but one of the songs contained on the EP are under two minutes in length; each song is played quickly in the style of punk rock. Initial pressings of the CD and Vinyl release came with a small adhesive label affixed with the following warning to music buyers: "Only 8 songs, Only 11 minutes, Only cheap $."

The EP was released to digital streaming services in 2020. A 180-gram clear vinyl reissue with two added bonus tracks, "Soba Violence" and a cover of "Light My Fire,"  was released for Record Store Day on July 17th, 2021.

Critical reception

Despite the EP only being about 10 minutes in length, the record received mostly positive reviews. Punknews.org complimented the album, saying that Aglio e Olio is "a testament to times when hardcore was about attitude, not drop D tuning, playing really fast, and listening to too much Pantera." Similarly, Randy Silver, Amazon.com said, "[t]here are better hardcore albums out there, and there are better Beastie Boys discs, but fans will still enjoy Aglio E Olio." Jam! Showbiz Music Reviews stated that the EP—and song "Deal with It" in particular, "is entirely representative of the faster-louder sound, which makes the Ramones seem like restless experimentalists by comparison."

AllMusic awarded the album two out of five stars, but did not publish a review.

Track listing

Charts

References 

1995 EPs
Beastie Boys EPs
Grand Royal EPs
Hardcore punk EPs